The Falling Astronauts is a science fiction novel by American writer  Barry N. Malzberg, first published in 1971 in a paperback edition by Ace Books.

Plot summary
The novel's protagonist Colonel Richard Martin suffers a mental breakdown during one of the series of space missions to test nuclear seismic charges on the Moon. Disillusioned by the space program, Martin agrees to handle public relations for one more mission before termination. However, the mission to install the seismic charges on the lunar surface goes awry when one of the astronauts goes rogue and threatens nuclear destruction upon Earth.

Reception
In 1972, The Magazine of Fantasy & Science Fictions Joanna Russ praised The Falling Astronauts with "What is astonishing about this novel is not that the protagonist (the point-of-view character) is mad, but that everyone else is, too. It is eerie to listen to a mad madman being interviewed by a ‘sane’ madman in a world where any pretense to ‘rationality’ is the maddest thing of all." Galaxy Science Fictions Theodore Sturgeon said "Malzberg gives a voice to the mixed-up, the impotent, to the torment of helplessness—and to the peculiar hope that personal integrity, even if it be irrational or wrong-headed, may just possibly be able to beat the system." In 1973, Algols Richard A. Lupoff reviewed the novel with "It's a study in the dehumanizing pressure of space-flight, from an author passionately devoted to the notion of space exploration."

In 2013, The Paris Reviews J. D. Daniels reviewed Malzberg's work including The Falling Astronauts with "[j]ust because I like it doesn’t mean it isn’t crap." While reviewing Beyond Apollo, The Encyclopedia of Science Fictions Don D'Ammassa said novels like The Falling Astronauts were "denounced regularly in letter columns and in the fan press."

In popular fiction
Under a pseudonym, Locus Onlines Paul Di Filippo reported that on April 1, 2006 writer Barry N. Malzberg was invited by Richard Branson to fly on the spaceflight company Virgin Galactic. The Falling Astronauts was one of the novels that "revealed the rot and canker and delusions at the roots of governmental space travel."

See also
Ace Science Fiction Specials
Barry N. Malzberg bibliography

References

External links
 

1971 American novels
1971 science fiction novels
American science fiction novels
Fiction with unreliable narrators
Novels set on the Moon
Space exploration novels